Dolichocephala guttata is a species of fly in the family Empididae. It is found in the  Palearctic.

References

External links
Images representing Dolichocephala guttata at BOLD

Empididae
Insects described in 1833
Asilomorph flies of Europe